William O'Neil McCurdy II (born April 16, 1988) is an American politician serving as a member of the Clark County Commission from District D. He was previously a member of the Nevada Assembly from 2016 to 2020 and chair of the Nevada Democratic Party from 2017 to 2021.

Early life and education
McCurdy was born in Las Vegas and raised in Vegas Heights. After having a child in high school, McCurdy dropped out and became a construction worker to be able to provide for his family. At the age of 24, McCurdy earned his associate's degree from the College of Southern Nevada, where he later became student body president. McCurdy is taking courses at the University of Nevada, Las Vegas toward a Bachelor of Science in urban studies.

Career 
After finding success in leadership in the field of construction, rising to the role of foreman on a large construction job on the Las Vegas Strip.

McCurdy was elected to the Nevada Assembly in 2016, prevailing in a four-way Democratic primary and defeating Republican general election opponent Carlo Maffatt in a landslide. McCurdy announced his bid for the Clark County Commission in August 2019.

McCurdy was elected chair of the Nevada Democratic Party on March 4, 2017. He was the party's first black chair and its youngest, at the age of 28, when elected.

He currently serves on the board of advisors of Let America Vote, an organization founded by former Missouri Secretary of State Jason Kander that aims to end voter suppression. McCurdy was a political director of the Service Employees International Union.

Personal life
McCurdy has two children.

Political positions
McCurdy supports raising the minimum wage to $15 an hour.

Electoral history

References

External links

 
 Campaign website
 Legislative website

|-

1988 births
21st-century American politicians
College of Southern Nevada alumni
Living people
Democratic Party members of the Nevada Assembly
Politicians from Las Vegas
State political party chairs of Nevada